Centrosomal protein of 63 kDa is a protein that in humans is encoded by the CEP63 gene.   Several alternatively spliced transcript variants have been found, but their biological validity has not been determined.

Function 

This gene encodes a protein with six coiled-coil domains. The protein is localized to the centrosome, a non-membraneous organelle that functions as the major microtubule-organizing center in animal cells. Recent computational analysis revealed pathogenic property of L61P point mutation in CEP63 protein that affected its native structural conformation.

Interactions 

CEP63 has been shown to interact with DISC1, CEP152 and CDK1.

References

External links

Further reading 

 
 
 
 
 

Centrosome